Darreh-ye Talayi (also Romanized as Darreh-ye Ţalāyī) is a village in Taftan-e Jonubi Rural District, Nukabad District, Khash County, Sistan and Baluchestan Province, Iran. At the 2006 census, its population was 112, in 24 families.

References 

Populated places in Khash County